The Marwa Tendubhata Thermal Power Station (by BHEL), is a coal-fired power station near Marwa village in Janjgir–Champa district, Chhattisgarh, India. The power station is owned by Chhattisgarh State Power Generation Company, state-owned generation utility.

There are two renowned schools in the proximity of the Power plant, named as Hasdeo Public School;& Delhi Public School.

Capacity
The planned capacity of the power plant in 1000 MW (2x500 MW).

References

External links
 Marwa power station at SourceWatch

Coal-fired power stations in Chhattisgarh
Janjgir-Champa district
2016 establishments in Chhattisgarh
Energy infrastructure completed in 2016